Otto Dumke (29 April 1887 – 4 August 1912) was a German international footballer.

References

1887 births
1912 deaths
Association football forwards
German footballers
Germany international footballers